Clubs from Montenegro are playing in European basketball competitions since the 1980s. Until 2006, they represented SFR Yugoslavia and FR Yugoslavia. Almost all European seasons by Montenegrin clubs are played by KK Budućnost. Exceptions are two single seasons in European competitions played by KK Lovćen Cetinje and KK Mornar Bar.

Most successful period was end of the 1990s and beginning of the 21st century. At that time, KK Budućnost played in the finish phases of EuroLeague. In that period, Budućnost often played games against greatest European basketball teams like FC Barcelona, Real Madrid, CSKA Moscow, Panathinaikos, Olympiacos, Maccabi Tel Aviv etc.

On season 2018-19, KK Budućnost made a comeback to EuroLeague. During that campaign, team from Podgorica made notable wins against CSKA Moscow, FC Barcelona and Real Madrid.

Performances by season
Below is a list of games of all Montenegrin clubs in FIBA/ULEB competitions.

Performances by clubs
During the overall history, three different Montenegrin clubs played in FIBA/ULEB competitions. KK Budućnost played in every competition (Euroleague, Eurocup/ULEB Cup, Saporta Cup/FIBA EuroCup, FIBA Korać Cup), while KK Lovćen played one season in FIBA Korać Cup, and KK Mornar in Basketball Champions League.

As of the end of FIBA/ULEB competitions 2019–20 season.

Scores by competitions
During the history, Montenegrin basketball clubs played in Euroleague, Eurocup/ULEB Cup, Saporta Cup/FIBA EuroCup and FIBA Korać Cup.
Below is the list of performances of Montenegrin clubs in every single European basketball competition.

As of the end of FIBA/ULEB competitions 2019–20 season.

Scores by opponents' countries
Below is the list of performances of Montenegrin clubs against opponents in FIBA/ULEB competitions by their countries (basketball federations).

As of the end of FIBA/ULEB competitions 2019–20 season.

See also
 Montenegrin Basketball League
 Second Basketball League
 Montenegrin Basketball Cup

References

External links
Official Website
Montenegrin league on Eurobasket